Ibrahim Mchinda Madîhali (born 16 November 1988) is a Comorian international footballer who plays for French club Pennoise, as a midfielder.

Career
Madîhali has played for 1er Canton, Endoume Catalans and Pennoise.

He made his international debut for Comoros in 2011.

References

1988 births
Living people
Comorian footballers
Comoros international footballers
Association football midfielders
Comorian expatriate footballers
Comorian expatriate sportspeople in France
Expatriate footballers in France